Bryan Gabriel Oña Simbaña (born December 12, 1993) is an Ecuadorian footballer who currently plays for El Nacional.

Playing career
Having started his career at El Nacional, Oña spent a year at Técnico Universitario, where he scored 5 goals in all competitions, before moving on to Cuenca. He signed a new, four-year contract with Cuenca in May 2016. However, on 6 March 2017, Oña joined Ecuadorian Serie A side Delfín.

Simbaña joined Universidad Católica for the 2019 season.

References

External links
 
 

1993 births
Living people
Ecuadorian footballers
Association football midfielders
People from Pichincha Province
C.D. El Nacional footballers
C.D. Técnico Universitario footballers
C.D. Cuenca footballers
Delfín S.C. footballers
C.D. Universidad Católica del Ecuador footballers
Ecuadorian Serie A players